Svay Rieng is the capital of Svay Rieng Province, Cambodia. The town is subdivided into 4 khums and 18 phums.

References

 

Provincial capitals in Cambodia
Cities in Cambodia
Populated places in Svay Rieng province